Lamarcus Brutus (born February 10, 1993) is an American football safety who is currently a free agent. He played college football at Florida State and signed with the Tennessee Titans in 2016.

College career
In 2012, as a redshirt freshman, Brutus played in six games mainly on special teams on the kickoff coverage team. In 2013, the redshirt sophomore saw action in 11 of FSU's 14 games as a backup defensive back and special teams contributor. He continued to expand his role with the Seminoles after a redshirt season in 2011. He set a then career high with six tackles – all solo – against Syracuse. In 2014, the fourth-year junior emerged as a productive reserve in the secondary, appearing in all 14 games. Brutus played as a safety in FSU's dime package, finishing with 15 tackles, two interceptions and a pass breakup. His first career interception came in the second quarter off Florida's Treon Harris and led to an FSU TD for a 21–9 lead. He later picked off Georgia Tech's Justin Thomas in the fourth quarter with 3:22 to play in the ACC Championship Game.

In 2015, the fifth-year senior worked his way into the starting lineup at free safety in his final season at Florida State. Brutus started all 13 games as one of the veteran leaders on the defensive side of the ball. He had a team-high three interceptions on the year, including one at Georgia Tech that was returned 57 yards and led to the only Seminole touchdown of the game. Brutus' three interceptions tied for seventh-most in the ACC, while his 94 return yards led the conference. He was voted Honorable Mention All-ACC by the media. Brutus finished third on the team in total tackles with 68 stops (46 solo), second only to freshman All-American Derwin James in unassisted tackles (52).

Professional career
The Titans signed Brutus as a rookie free agent on May 9, 2016. He was released on August 28, 2016. He signed with the Orlando Apollos in 2018 for the 2019 season. He was waived/injured before the start of the 2019 regular season and subsequently placed on injured reserve after clearing waivers. He was waived from injured reserve on March 26, 2019.

References

External links
Florida State Seminoles bio

1993 births
Living people
People from Port St. Lucie, Florida
Players of American football from Florida
American football safeties
Florida State Seminoles football players
Tennessee Titans players
Orlando Apollos players